Ferrovie dello Stato (FS; Italian State Railways) Class 736 (Italian: Gruppo 736) was a class of 2-8-0 steam locomotives ex-United States Army Transportation Corps (USATC) 2-8-0 steam locomotives of the S160 Class.  There were 243 locomotives in this class, numbered 736.001-243.  They were taken to Italy by invading US forces.  

In 1959, twenty-five locomotives of this class Nos 736.011/23/40/55/73/90/101/2/126/7/131/5/51/8/60/4/6/78/88/90/9/203/7/9/17 were sold to the Hellenic State Railways (Greek Railways, SEK), to add to their Class Θγ.

References

736
USATC S160 Class
2-8-0 locomotives
ALCO locomotives
Baldwin locomotives
Lima locomotives
Scrapped locomotives
Standard gauge locomotives of Italy
1′D h2 locomotives